The 2013 Fremantle Football Club season was the club's 19th season of senior competition in the Australian Football League (AFL).  It was the club's most successful season to date, recording their second most wins in a season, highest percentage and second highest final ladder position of 3rd.  The club won its first ever Qualifying Final, and defeated  in the Preliminary Final at Patersons Stadium and played in its first AFL Grand Final against , losing by 15 points.

Squad
 Players are listed by jumper number. 2013 statistics are for AFL regular season and finals series matches during the 2013 AFL season only. Age is as the end of the season, 28 September 2013. Career statistics include a player's complete AFL career, which include games played for other AFL clubs. Statistics are correct as of the end of the 2013 season. Sources: Career and season

Squad changes
The 2012 AFL Draft contained a free agency trade provision for the first time.  Fremantle was the first club to lodge a bid for a free agent when the put in a four-year offer to recruit Danyle Pearce from Port Adelaide.  As a restricted free agent, Port could have matched Fremantle's offer, but chose not to.

During the trading and drafting period, the futures of Adam McPhee and Jack Anthony at the club were in doubt, however McPhee signed a one-year contract extension in October. On 20 November, two days before the National Draft, McPhee announced that he was retiring to return to Victoria and Anthony was delisted, despite having a year to go on his contract.

In to squad

Out of squad

Season summary

Pre-season matches

Regular season

Finals series

Ladder

Awards, Records & Milestones

Club awards
The Doig Medal was awarded at a function at the Perth Convention Exhibition Centre on 16 November.  Between 1 and 5 votes are awarded to each player by five coaches after each game. Nathan Fyfe won his first Doig Medal, after previously finishing second in 2011.
 Doig Medal: Nathan Fyfe, 263 votes
 2nd: David Mundy, 246 votes
 3rd: Michael Johnson, 239 votes
 4th: Ryan Crowley, 238 votes
 5th: Lee Spurr, 226 votes
 6th: Chris Mayne, 219 votes
 7th: Michael Barlow, 216 votes
 8th: Hayden Ballantyne, 192 votes
 9th: Michael Walters, 186 votes
 10th: Tendai Mzungu, 180 votes
 Best Clubman: Lee Spurr
 Beacon Award: Cameron Sutcliffe

Milestones
 Round 1 - Michael Johnson (150 AFL games)
 Round 3 - Luke McPharlin (200 Fremantle games)
 Round 4 - Michael Barlow (50  AFL games)
 Round 4 - Ryan Crowley (100  AFL goals)
 Round 4 - Hayden Ballantyne (100  AFL goals)
 Round 12 - Ryan Crowley (150  AFL games)
 Round 13 - Tendai Mzungu (50  AFL games)
 Round 16 - Stephen Hill (100  AFL games)
 Round 20 - Chris Mayne (100  AFL games)
 Round 22 - Zac Clarke (50  AFL games)
 2nd Preliminary Final - Matt de Boer (100  AFL games)

Debuts
 Round 1 - Danyle Pearce
 Round 4 - Tanner Smith
 Round 5 - Jack Hannath
 Round 13 - Matt Taberner
 Round 14 - Viv Michie
 Round 23 - Josh Simpson
 Round 23 - Alex Forster
 Round 23 - Craig Moller

AFL Awards
 Herald Sun Player of the Year - Nathan Fyfe (tied with Gary Ablett, Jr.)
 2013 All-Australian team - Michael Johnson
 2013 All-Australian squad - Nathan Fyfe, Chris Mayne, David Mundy and Michael Walters
 2013 22under22 team - Nathan Fyfe and Michael Walters
 ABC Footballer of the Year - Nathan Fyfe (tied with Dane Swan)
 720 ABC Perth Geoff Christian Medal - Nathan Fyfe
 Ross Glendinning Medal:
 Round 1 - David Mundy and Michael Barlow (tie)
 Round 16 - Michael Barlow

AFL Award Nominations
 Round 13 - 2013 AFL Mark of the Year nomination and weekly winner - Nathan Fyfe
 Round 16 - 2013 AFL Mark of the Year nomination - Tendai Mzungu
 Round 16 - 2013 AFL Mark of the Year nomination - Chris Mayne
 Round 20 - 2013 AFL Goal of the Year nomination and weekly winner - Hayden Ballantyne
 Round 21 - 2013 AFL Mark of the Year nomination and weekly winner - Zac Clarke

Notes
 Key

 H ^ Home match.
 A ^ Away match.

 Notes
Fremantle's scores are indicated in bold font.

References

External links
 Official website of the Fremantle Football Club
 Official website of the Australian Football League

2013
Fremantle Football Club